The Unaza busline is a bus line located in Tirana, Albania. The line runs from the north of the city to Lana River.

The length of a round-trip  on the bus is 11.8 km, and it is operated by Ferlut.

See also
 Bus lines in Tirana

References

Transport in Tirana